Mohammad Younus Shaikh (or Younis Sheik or Younis Sheikh) (born 1965) is a hotel manager and writer in Kharadar, Pakistan. In 2005, he wrote a book: "Shaitan Maulvi" (Satanic Cleric). On account of that book, the police charged Shaikh with offences under Pakistan's Penal Code and under the Anti-terrorism Act. An anti-terrorism court found Shaikh guilty of those offences, and sentenced him to a fine and to life in prison. Amnesty International designated him a prisoner of conscience and called for his immediate release.

Personal details
Shaikh is a matriculate but he has not had any religious education.

The offence
On 3 February 2005, Shaikh was distributing copies of his book when he came to the attention of Sub-inspector Gulzar Ahmed Khokhar. The Sub-inspector arrested Shaikh for violating Sections 153A, 295A, and 295B of the Pakistan Penal Code, and Sections 8 and 9 of the Anti-terrorism Act. The police placed Shaikh in solitary confinement in Karachi Central Prison to prevent other inmates from attacking him.

At trial, the special public prosecutor proved that Shaikh had committed blasphemy by writing that stoning to death (Rajm) as a punishment for adultery was not mentioned in the Quran, and by insulting four historical Imams (religious leaders) by describing them as "Jews".

On 11 August 2005, Judge Arshad Noor Khan of the Anti-Terrorist Court found Shaikh guilty of "defiling a copy of the Quran, outraging religious feelings and propagating religious hatred among society". The judge imposed upon Shaikh a fine of 100,000 rupees, and sentenced him to spend his life in jail.

In 2007, a blogger reported that Shaikh appealed his conviction to the High Court, and won the right to a new trial.

At least one observer, legal historian Sadakat Kadri, has noted the case as an example of the "mean spirit" of some anti-blaspheme campaigners, as, in fact Shaikh is correct that nowhere in the Quran is stoning to death (rajm) called for to punish the sin of adultery or fornication (zina). (The Quran mentions only lashing as a punishment for zina. It is ahadith (the collections of the reports claiming to quote what the prophet Muhammad said) that call for rajm.)

See also 
 Apostasy in Islam
 Blasphemy
 Blasphemy in Pakistan

References

External links 
Pakistan: Author gets life term for "blasphemy" – Rationalist International Bulletin #146 (19 August 2005)

1965 births
Amnesty International prisoners of conscience held by Pakistan
Living people
Pakistani writers
Pakistani prisoners sentenced to life imprisonment
People convicted of blasphemy in Pakistan
Prisoners sentenced to life imprisonment by Pakistan
People imprisoned on charges of terrorism